This is a list of Archbishops of Nikozi of the Georgian Orthodox and Apostolic Church. The see functions at the Zemo Nikozi church of the Deity.
 Isaia (present)

Georgian Orthodox Church
Nikozi